The National Freedom Party (NFP) is a South African political party. It was launched on 25 January 2011 by Zanele kaMagwaza-Msibi, former chairperson of the Inkatha Freedom Party (IFP), along with other former IFP members.

Election results
In the 2011 municipal election, the NFP received 2.4% of the votes cast in South Africa, and 10.4% of the votes cast in KwaZulu-Natal province. It won a majority of seats in the eDumbe Local Municipality and a plurality in Nongoma Local Municipality. Following the 2014 South African general election, the party's leader Magwaza-Msibi was appointed to the position of Deputy Minister of Science and Technology. The party was disqualified from participating in the 2016 municipal election as it had failed to pay the election fee to the Independent Electoral Commission.

The party contested the 2019 general elections and its support levels dropped. The party lost four seats in the National Assembly, bringing their seat total to only two seats. In KwaZulu-Natal, the party's support was greatly diminished. The party had lost five seats in the provincial legislature, but managed to win a single seat, occupied by the party's National Organizer, Cynthia Mbali Shinga. Magwaza-Msibi was not reappointed to the cabinet and resigned as an MP on 20 June 2019, citing her intention to rebuild the party.

On 6 September 2021, shortly before the 2021 South African municipal elections, Magwaza-Msibi died from a COVID-19-related cardiac arrest.

The party won 170,616 votes, 0.56% of the national total, in the elections, winning back one municipality it formerly ran in 2011 to 2016, the eDumbe Local Municipality.

National elections

|-
! Election
! Total votes
! Share of vote
! Seats 
! +/–
! Government
|-
! 2014 
| 288,742
| 1.57%
| 
| –
| 
|-
! 2019
| 61,220
| 0.35%
| 
|  4
| 
|}

Provincial elections

! rowspan=2 | Election
! colspan=2 | Eastern Cape
! colspan=2 | Free State
! colspan=2 | Gauteng
! colspan=2 | Kwazulu-Natal
! colspan=2 | Limpopo
! colspan=2 | Mpumalanga
! colspan=2 | North-West
! colspan=2 | Northern Cape
! colspan=2 | Western Cape
|-
! % !! Seats
! % !! Seats
! % !! Seats
! % !! Seats
! % !! Seats
! % !! Seats
! % !! Seats
! % !! Seats
! % !! Seats
|-
! 2014
| 0.16% || 0/63
| 0.11% || 0/30
| 0.47% || 0/73
| 7.31% || 6/80
| 0.04% || 0/49
| 0.75% || 0/30
| 0.15% || 0/33
| 0.03% || 0/30
| 0.04% || 0/42
|-
! 2019
| 0.03% || 0/63
| 0.03% || 0/30
| 0.07% || 0/73
| 1.57% || 1/80
| 0.01% || 0/49
| 0.12% || 0/30
| 0.06% || 0/33
| 0.04% || 0/30
| 0.11% || 0/42
|}

Municipal elections

|-
! Election
! Votes
! %
|-
! 2011
| 644,917
| 2.4%
|-
! 2016
| 5,224
| 0.01%
|-
! 2021
| 170,616
| 0.56%
|-
|}

References

2011 establishments in South Africa
Political parties established in 2011
Political parties in South Africa
Social democratic parties in South Africa